Dr. Santiago María del Granado y Navarro Calderón, 1st Count of Cotoca (1757 in Cadiz, Spain – 1823 in Santa Cruz de la Sierra, Bolivia), was a Spanish nobleman and physician, who at the beginning of the 19th century traveled through some of the most remote regions of South America where epidemics were raging, to inoculate Native Americans with the recently discovered vaccine and prevent the spread of smallpox.

His humanitarian efforts paralleled Dr. Francisco Xavier Balmis and Dr. Josep Salvany i Lleopart's 19th-century Spanish expedition to deliver smallpox vaccine to the New World. The idealistic spirit of Dr. del Granado's vaccine mission is a sensational and heartwarming page from the history of Spanish medicine. He saved thousands upon thousands of lives, as reported by the Spanish viceroy at Rio de la Plata Santiago de Liniers and public health official Dr. Miguel O'Gorman to the Supreme Central and Governmental Junta of Spain and the Indies during the political upheaval of the Napoleonic invasions.

Dr. del Granado was the great-great-grandfather of the Bolivian poet laureate Javier del Granado y Granado.

References 

 Antonio Dubravcic-Luksic, Diccionario biográfico médico hispanoamericano, p. 24 (2006)
 Susana María Ramírez Martín, La salud del Imperio: La Real Expedición Filantrópica de la Vacuna, p. 171 (2002)
 Josep M. Barnadas, "Granado Navarro, Santiago", Diccionario histórico de Bolivia, (2002)
 Jorge Garrett Aillón, Historia de la medicina en Santa Cruz, pp. 74–76, 212–216, 404 (1992)
 Gabriel René Moreno, Biblioteca boliviana: Catálogo del archivo de Mojos y Chiquitos, p. 420 (1888)

1757 births
1823 deaths
Smallpox vaccines
19th-century Spanish physicians